3rd Earl of Derby may refer to:

 William de Ferrers, 3rd Earl of Derby (died 1190), English nobleman
 Henry IV of England (1367–1413), previously the Earl of Derby, King of England and Lord of Ireland from 1399
 Edward Stanley, 3rd Earl of Derby (c. 1509–1572), English nobleman and politician